Kaimana is a district and a small port town in West Papua, Indonesia and capital of the Kaimana Regency. It had a population of 13,613 at the 2010 Census.

Many ancient rock art can be found this district, from Mai Mai cliff drawing, Omborecena, Memnemba, Memnemnambe and Tumberawasi sites in Kampung Mai Mai, Bitsjari cape drawings in Kampung Marsi, Werfora sites (I to IV) in Kampung Namatota, and Kamaka lake drawings.

Transport

It is served by Utarom Airport.

Environment
Kaimana is part of a Sea Conservation Area in West Papua. Butterflies in the surrounding forest of Karora are reported to be on the brink of extinction due to logging in the district.

Whales such as Bryde's whales can be seen in nearby waters such as in the Triton Bay.

Climate
Kaimana has a tropical rainforest climate (Af) with heavy rainfall year-round.

References

Populated places in West Papua
Regency seats of West Papua (province)